Tippi Benjamine Okanti Degré (born June 4, 1990) is a French woman best known for spending her youth in Namibia among wild animals and tribes people. In 1997, she was the protagonist of Le Monde selon Tippi, filmed in Namibia and Botswana. When she was 10, Degré wrote Tippi My Book of Africa. In 2002–03, she was the presenter of Around the World with Tippi, six wildlife and environmental TV documentaries.

Biography
Tippi Degré was born in Windhoek, Namibia, on June 4, 1990, to wildlife photographer-filmmaker parents and was raised in the bush for the first ten years of her life in Southern Africa. She was named after the American actress Tippi Hedren as well as friend of her parents Gert Benjamin Jordaan, a guide they knew in Namibia at the time of Tippi's birth. During her childhood in Namibia, Degré befriended animals she lived among including a 28-year old elephant Abu, a leopard nicknamed J&B, lions, giraffes, a banded mongoose, an ostrich, meerkats, a cheetah, a caracal, snakes, a giant bullfrog and chameleons.

In 2000, Degré wrote the novel Tippi - My Book of Africa, based on her life in Namibia, Botswana, South Africa, Zimbabwe and Madagascar where she lived among wild animals and with tribes people, the San Bushmen and the Himbas.

In 2001, she was named the Godmother of the World Wide Fund for Nature (WWF) with the French actor, producer and director Jacques Perrin. From 2002 to 2003, Degré presented six wildlife and environmental TV documentaries for the Discovery Channel.

A documentary film on her experiences, Le Monde Selon Tippi ("The World According to Tippi") was released in 1997. Around the World with Tippi was released in 2004, directed by Jeanne Mascolo de Filippis.

Degré studied cinema and audiovisuals in France. Active in conservation and in the documentary film industry, she is a speaker and is currently the director of "El Petit FICMA," the children's section of the FICMA International Environmental Film Festival (Barcelona).

See also
 Marlice van Vuuren
 Sabine Kuegler

Bibliography

References
Notes

Further reading

External links
 Official website
 
 Le Monde Selon Tippi at the Internet Movie Database
Tippi's World

1990 births
Living people
French expatriates in Namibia
French children